Jim Bianco and the Tim Davies Big Band is a collaboration between Jim Bianco and Tim Davies. Tim Davies arranged and adapted Bianco's songs and conducted his 19 piece big band, while Bianco provided the vocals.

Track listing
All songs, words and music were written by Jim Bianco (BMI) except 
“You are the One”: words and music by Tim Davies (ASCAP/Altered 15th) and Jim Bianco (BMI) 
“Crying Because” and “Taffy and Cream Caramel”: words by Jim Bianco (BMI), music by Tim Davies (ASCAP/Altered 15th)
“Distracted” – 4:53
 “Handsome Devil” – 4:02
 “You Are The One” – 2:57
 “Apostrophe S ” – 4:16
 “Crying Because“– 4:26
 “Forever And A Day” – 3:11
 “Long Way Home” – 4:18
 “Taffy and Cream Caramel” – 3:00 (bonus track)

Personnel
Jim Bianco–vocals
The Tim Davies Big Band performs on tracks 1, 2, 4, 5, and 7
Mike Acosta – saxophone
Karolyn Kafer – saxophone
Mike Nelson – saxophone
Lee Secard – saxophone
Jennifer Hall – saxophone
Jon Papenbrook – trumpet, trumpet solo on "Long Way Home"
Stan Martin – trumpet
Frank Ponchorello – trumpet
Steve Campos – trumpet
Jacques Voyemant – trombone, trombone solo on "Apostrophe S"
Kerry Loeschen – trombone
John Baker – trombone
Steve Ferguson – trombone
Mark Cally – guitar
Alan Steinberger – piano and organ
Jonathan Ahrens – bass
Tim Davies – drums and percussion
The Tim Davies Quartet performs on tracks 3, 5 and 8
Jon Papenbrook – trumpet
Mark Cally – guitar
Steve Pandis – bass
Tim Davies – drums and programming
Additional Musicians
Matt DeMerriitt – tenor sax on "Taffy and Cream Caramel"
Sal Cracchiolo – trumpet solo on "Distracted"
Jim Bianco, Tim Davies and Vincent Mourou – glee club on "Apostrophe S"

Additional Production Information
All song arranged and conducted by Tim Davies
Executive Producer: Nate Richert
Recorded and mixed by Steve Kaplan
Big Band recording assisted by Mike Sherlock
Big Band produced by Tim Davies and Steve Kaplan
Quartet produced by Tim Davies and Jim Bianco
All photography by Greg Cohen shot at the Hotel Cafe
Art layout by Jim Bianco
Art production by Tammy Bumann

Studio information
This album was recorded at Citrus Recording Arts and 745 Studios in Los Angeles.

External links
 Official Jim Bianco website
 Official Tim Davies Big Band website
 Official Tim Davies website

Jim Bianco albums
2003 albums